Farrar's Island is a peninsula on the west side of the James River in Chesterfield County, Virginia. It is the site of the Dutch Gap Conservation Area and Boat Landing and the Henricus Historical Park. Originally, Farrar's Island was formed by a meander loop in the James River and lay on the east side of the James River. At its smallest point, the neck of the peninsula was less than 400 feet wide.

Due to its strategic location on the river, the neck of the peninsula became the site of the earliest English settlements in Virginia, Henricus, was founded by Sir Thomas Dale in 1611. Farrar's Island acquired its name after 1637 when the Farrar family obtained ownership as fulfillment the headright due to William Farrar, an early settler who was councillor and commissioner of the Crown Colony of Virginia. The Farrar family owned the peninsula until 1737 when it was sold to Thomas Randolph.

During the last year of the American Civil War, Farrar's Island played a minor role in the Bermuda Hundred campaign. The James River along the peninsula anchored the left flank of Union General Benjamin Butler's defensive line. At this time, Farrar's Island was the site of river defenses by both Union and Confederate to deny the use of the James River to the enemy. The James River around Farrar's Island was also the site of one of the last major naval engagements of the war, the Battle of Trent's Reach. During the war, Farrar's Island became a true island when General Butler's troops built the Dutch Gap Canal, across the neck of the peninsula.

In the 1870s, the Dutch Gap Canal was expanded to become the main channel of the James River, which allowed shipping to bypass the meander loop around Farrar's Island. The construction of the canal put Farrar's Island on the west side of the James River and it evolved into its present form with a tidal lagoon surround by woods and wetlands.

Colonial history

In colonial history, Farrar's Island was technically a peninsula or a neck of land. However, in 17th century Virginia when the land was acquired by the Farrar family, a neck of land mainly surrounded by a river could also be known as an island. At its most narrow point, the neck was less than 200 yards wide and its elevation above the James River varied from 3 feet to about 49 feet. In the original patent that gave the land to William Farrar, the peninsula was called an island; though in the will of his son, his namesake, the land was called a neck. By the time of the American Civil War, the peninsula had acquired its common name of Farrar's Island.

At the time of English-Native American contact period starting around 1607, the area around Farrar's Island was associated with the Arrohattoc, a tribe within the Powhatan Confederacy. The tribe's village of Arrohateck is depicted in John Smith and William Holes's map of 1607 Virginia as located approximately on the east side of the James River approximately 5 leagues (15 miles) south of the river's fall line. However, Arrohateck village was apparently deserted by the time the English began settling in the area.

The first English settlement on Farrar's Island was Henricus, which was founded in 1611 by Sir Thomas Dale who the deputy-governor of the Virginia Colony. The settlement was located on the neck of the peninsula, which was near the location of the former village of Arrohateck. The founding of Henricus was commissioned by the Virginia Company of London, who ordered Dale to find a healthy location to secure the navigable portion of the upstream James River and to provide a place of retreat in case of an attack by the Spanish. Intending the new settlement to become the principal seat of the colony, Dale rapidly made Henricus a well-built, strongly-fortified settlement. Part of Henricus's fortifications included a ditch with a palisade behind that ran across the neck of the peninsula. The historian Robert Hunt Land suggests that it was at this time that the peninsula's neck got the name "Dale's Dutch Gap", as Dale had served as a long-time soldier of fortune with the United Provinces of the Netherlands. However, the settlement did not thrive. By the time Dale returned to England in 1616, Henricus was already in a dilapidated state, consisting of few houses and the ruins of a never-completed church. Though Henricus was incorporated into the City of Henrico, what was left of it was abandoned after the Powhatan attack of 1622, as the settlement was not listed as one of the fortified strongholds that the Virginia Company ordered survivors to move to.

In 1637, Farrar's Island became the property of the son and namesake of the councillor, William Farrar. The peninsula was part of a 2000-acre patent along the James River granted by Governor John Harvey. Before he died, the elder William Farrar had acquired the acreage through headright for providing the cost of transporting 40 persons from England to the Virginia Colony.

Farrar's Island remained with the Farrar family until it was sold to Thomas Randolph in 1727. In May 1771, heavy rains fell on the mountains to the west of Richmond for 12 days. These rains cause a deluge known as "The Great Fresh of 1771", which inundated the settlements and plantations along James River. Because it was almost entirely surrounded by the James, Farrar’s Island was particularly hard hit. All the property of the current owner, Thomas Mann Randolph was carried off by the flood, and the economic value of the land was also severely reduced as 80 acres of the peninsula's arable topsoil were washed away, leaving in its stead a pavement of stones.

Civil War history
By the time of the Civil War, Farrar's Island was owned by Henry Cox of Farmer's Rest, who had substantial landholding on the James River, and was sometimes referred to as Cox's Island

In May 1864, Union General Benjamin Butler's initiated the Bermuda Hundred campaign by landing the Army of the James at Bermuda Hundred and occupied the east side of the James River between Bermuda Hundred and Farrar's Island. After Butler gave up on his maneuver towards Richmond at his defeat at the Battle of Proctor's Creek, the Army of the James retreated back to a line on the Bermuda Hundred Peninsula stretching from a bluff on the south bank of the James river overlooking Farrar's Island, which was called Trent's Reach, to the mouth of the Appomattox River. The Confederates then entrenched their forces on the Howlett Line, which was approximately parallel to the Union defenses. These fortified lines were held with only minor changes until after the end of the Siege of Petersburg in April 1865.

During this time, Farrar's Island became the front line in the struggle to control the James River. In June 1864, General Ulysses S. Grant ordered the Union navy under Admiral Samuel Phillips Lee to sink five ships, which were then used to create an obstruction boom across the James River stretching between Farrar's Island and Trent's Reach.The purpose of this barrier was to prevent Confederate warships from going downstream and attacking Grant's headquarter and depot during the Petersburg Campaign, which were located at City Point. The Confederates prevented Union warships from moving north by posting artillery batteries on the Howlett Line, as well as additional batteries on the east side of the James River north of Farrar's Island. These batteries provided a field of fire over almost all of the five-mile loop of the James that encircled Farrar's Island.

To bypass the loop around Farrar's Island, General Butler began excavating a canal to cut across the neck of the peninsula at the Dutch Gap Canal. The work was begun in August 1864 and the canal completely cut the neck on January 1865. However, the explosion that removed the bulkhead at the north end of the canal to open it up threw so much debris and fallen earth into the canal that it was unusable by armed vessels, and dredging continued until the end of the war in April 1865. The completion of the canal made Farrar's Island a true island.

Also in January 1865, the James River around Farrar's Island was became the site of one of the Civil War's last major naval battles, the Battle of Trent's Reach. In this battle, a Confederate flotilla of three ironclads and eight other warships were repulsed as they attempted to get through the Union boom between Farrar's Island and Trent's Reach.

Post-Civil War history

Immediately after the Civil War, Dutch Gap Canal remained unusable because Henry Cox, who still owned Farrar's Island, had filled in the northern end of the canal with a causeway to access the island; however, a flood in 1870 washed away the causeway and opened the canal to development. Improvements to the canal were not made until after 1871, and ongoing deepening and widening under the guidance of the Army Corps of Engineers continued at least through to the end of the 1870s. The subsequent owner of Farrar's Island, Richard Friend, who inherited the property from Cox in 1888, filed suit against the United States Government to recover his claimed losses due to the improvement of the canal, but lost his case.

In 1918, Farrar's Island became part of the Dutch Gap Range during World War I. The 80th Division's artillery regiments, who were stationed in Fort Lee, used the island for gunnery training before heading to France and fighting in the Meuse-Argonne offensive.

Between 1920 and 1940, approximately 300 acres of Farrar Island was transformed into a tidal lagoon surrounded by wetland when the Richmond Sand and Gravel Company mined the area, creating a large pit that was subsequently connected to the old James River channel for barges to load the sand and gravel. In 1983, another 103 acres of Farrar's Island was transformed into an ash pond for the nearby Dominion Chesterfield Power Station located on the Dutch Gap Cutoff on the James River; though as of 2020, Dominion will be moving the coal ash from the pond on Farrar's Island to a lined landfill at the Chester Power Station. This transfer of coal ash is expected to take 15 to 20 years.

Farrar's Island today

Today, Farrar's Island is now part of the Dutch Gap Conservation Area and is the location of Henricus Historical Park. Farrar's Island has once more become a peninsula as a section of the old river on the north side of the island has been filled in over time. However, this peninsula now lies on the east bank of the James River.

References

External links

 Link to role of Farrar's Island in American Civil War

Peninsulas of Virginia